Michael Tyrone Sharperson (October 4, 1961 – May 26, 1996) was an infielder in Major League Baseball who played for the Toronto Blue Jays (1987), Los Angeles Dodgers (1987–1993) and Atlanta Braves (1995). Sharperson batted and threw right-handed. He was born in Orangeburg, South Carolina.

In an eight-season career, Sharperson posted a .280 batting average with 10 home runs and 123 RBI in 557 games.

Career
Sharperson was drafted by the Toronto Blue Jays in the first round (11th pick) of the 1981 amateur draft. He made his debut with Toronto in 1987 and was traded to the Los Angeles Dodgers in midseason.
 
A member of the Dodgers' 1988 World Series championship team, Sharperson was part of the group of utility players known as "The Stunt Men", for their ability to play many different positions and roles. While mostly used at third base and second, Sharperson also played shortstop, first base and right field.

In 1990, Sharperson hit .297 with career-highs in hits (106) and games (129). His most productive season came in 1992, when he hit .300 with 21 doubles and 48 runs (all career-highs), and made the National League All-Star team.

Released by the Dodgers before the 1994 season, Sharperson signed with the Red Sox, then with the Cubs, but did not play for them. He appeared in seven games with the Atlanta Braves in 1995 and became a free agent at the end of the season. He then signed a minor league contract with the San Diego Padres.

Death
In 1996, Sharperson was playing for the Triple-A Las Vegas Stars. He was driving to McCarran International Airport to join the Padres in Montreal against the Expos after being recalled when he died in a one-car crash at the junction of I-15 and I-215 just south of the Las Vegas Strip. He was southbound on I-15 at about 2:45 a.m. when he apparently realized he missed his turn onto I-215. A witness said that Sharperson tried to make a right turn onto I-215, but lost control in the rain and went into a dirt median. Local law enforcement who arrived at the scene of the accident stated that Sharperson had been ejected through his car's sunroof during the accident. He was 34 years old.

See also
 List of baseball players who died during their careers

References

External links

Baseball Almanac
Retrosheet
The Baseball Gauge
Venezuela Winter League

1961 births
1996 deaths
African-American baseball players
Albuquerque Dukes players
American expatriate baseball players in Canada
Atlanta Braves players
Baseball players from South Carolina
Florence Blue Jays players
Georgia Perimeter Jaguars baseball players
Iowa Cubs players
Kinston Blue Jays players
Knoxville Blue Jays players
Las Vegas Stars (baseball) players
Los Angeles Dodgers players
Leones del Caracas players
American expatriate baseball players in Venezuela
Major League Baseball infielders
National League All-Stars
Pawtucket Red Sox players
People from Orangeburg, South Carolina
Richmond Braves players
Road incident deaths in Nevada
Syracuse Chiefs players
Toronto Blue Jays players
20th-century African-American sportspeople